The Kincaid-Howard House is a historic mansion in Fincastle, Tennessee, USA. It was designed in the Federal architectural style and completed in 1845. It was built for John Kincaid II, a planter and slaveholder in the Antebellum South. It has been listed on the National Register of Historic Places since March 16, 1976.

References

Houses on the National Register of Historic Places in Tennessee
Federal architecture in Tennessee
Houses completed in 1845
Buildings and structures in Campbell County, Tennessee
Plantations in Tennessee
1845 establishments in Tennessee
National Register of Historic Places in Campbell County, Tennessee